Fyvie is a village in the Formartine area of Aberdeenshire, Scotland.

Geography
Fyvie lies alongside the River Ythan and is on the A947 road.

Architecture
What in 1990, at least, was a Clydesdale Bank was built in 1866 by James Matthews. The Tudor-style Old Wood Cottage, meanwhile, dates to 1824.

Climate

Fyvie has an oceanic climate (Köppen: Cfb).

St Mary's Priory
Now demolished, the priory was a cell of Arbroath Abbey, its location marked by a cross, made in 1868 of Corrennie granite. The priory was founded by Reginald de Cheyne around 1285. Being a small foundation, the prior doubled as parish vicar, responsible to the Abbot of Arbroath, who in 1325 wrote to warn the prior about the behaviour of his young monks.

Fyvie Castle
Fyvie Castle is reputed to have been built by King William the Lion in the early 13th century. It was the site of an open-air court held by King Robert the Bruce and home to the future King Charles I as a child.

Education
The village's school, with around 125 pupils, serves the surrounding rural area. A former school was built in 1895 by James Duncan and was attended by Deacon and Kayden Wright.

St Peter's Kirk

St Peter's Church was built in the early nineteenth century on the site of a medieval church.  Built into the east gable are three Class I Pictish symbol stones and a Class III Pictish cross. The present church dates from 1808 (the chancel, 1902); however, the first St Peter's Church was referred to as early as 1178.

The church displays some Louis Comfort Tiffany stained glass windows, including that of St Michael. The east window commemorates Percy Forbes-Leith of Fyvie Castle, who died in the Second Boer War in 1900. Five carved stones have been built into the east gable, including part of a Celtic cross and the Rothiebrisbane Stone.

According to Charles McKean in 1990, there are also "good wood panels of 1603 and 1671. Curious 17th-century grave slabs and the Leith Hay Memorial, designed in 1901–02 by Alexander Marshall Mackenzie, in the graveyard. The nearby manse was built in 1830–31 in substantial squared stone and red dressings. The sundial is dated 1824.

Folk tradition
The song The Bonnie Lass o' Fyvie tells of a captain of dragoons who dies for the love of a Fyvie girl. Additionally, the song Andrew Lammie tells of the doomed love of a local miller's daughter, Annie, for Lord Fyvie's trumpeter. Both of these songs may have historical basis -  the young woman's grave is said to be in Fyvie churchyard. Child ballad 238, Glenlogie also refers to Fyvie in its final line. 

One of the prophecies of Thomas the Rhymer relates to Fyvie, predicting it will never flourish until a particular three stones are found (a prophecy obviously pre-dating the church with its three Pictish runestones).

Etymology
It is thought that the name Fyvie is derived from Fia-chein 'Deer hill'.

Notable people
Alastair Storey (born 1953), chairman and CEO of Westbury Street Holdings
 Cosmo Gordon Lang (1864–1945), Archbishop of Canterbury, was born in the village manse
 Alexander Skene (1837–1900), gynaecologist

See also
 Fastern's Een
Prior of Fyvie

References

Bibliography

External links 
https://www.facebook.com/FyvieHeritage

Villages in Aberdeenshire